The Fridge was a nightclub in the Brixton area of South London, England, founded, in 1981, by Andrew Czezowski and Susan Carrington, who had run the Roxy during punk music's heyday in 1977. The Fridge closed on 17 March 2010 and has no link with Electric Brixton which opened in September 2011 and now occupies the building.

History
The Fridge started in 1981, in a small club at 390 Brixton Rd, and later, in 1982, above Iceland in Brixton Road with a radical decor that included beat-up ice boxes and artificial dead cats hanging from its ceiling. Early guest DJs included Keith Barker-Main, later a lifestyle journalist and social commentator.  It claims to have been the first British club to have such innovations as video screens and a chill out lounge. The Fridge was at the heart of the early 80s New Romantic movement, and booked such acts as Eurythmics and the Pet Shop Boys before they were well known and drew famous faces such as Boy George,  Frankie Goes to Hollywood, Magenta Devine, as well as Marc Almond and Grace Jones, who also performed there. Although all the nights at The Fridge welcomed anyone, the Friday nights were aimed primarily at the straight community in contrast to Love Muscle which was promoted as a gay night.

In 1984, as a result of increased popularity, the club moved to its final location: a converted 1913 cinema (The Palladium Picture House) formerly a roller-disco called the ACE on the Town Hall Parade.  Joe Strummer from  The Clash invested £5,000 in the new club. Andrew explains during an interview for 3:AM magazine, "what the club achieved since then -- its visuals laid the template for the rave scene, it's a look that's being copied across the world. There's been no recognition of course -- if a record is influential it's on vinyl for all to hear throughout history, but you can't really encapsulate a visual in the same way, people just take it for granted. Basically the look of modern-day clubs was started here in 1986."

In July 1985, Czezowski and Carrington launched their own Record Company, Latex Records. located at the Fridge. Yvette the Conqueror was the first artist signed to the label. The label's first release was a single by Yvette the Conqueror, titled "The Boys Were There", produced by Iain Williams (from the bands You You You and Big Bang). Czezowski and Carrington also promoted many bands at the Fridge, one of which was the cult club-band You You You featuring club promoter Laurence Malice, Karen O'Connor and Iain Williams. The band performed a sell-out concert at the Fridge on 27 March 1987, at which Czezowski had a huge white staircase built on the stage for the band to perform on. The show was filmed for Japanese television. Since then it has hosted a variety of club nights most notably Soul II Soul (1988 - 1993) Daisy Chain (1987-1990) and Escape From Samsara (1995-2005).

Club Nights

Soul II Soul

Having moved from the Africa Centre in 1988 Jazzie B's Soul II Soul collective's weekly residency pumped out an eclectic mix of “Funki Dredd" – "A happy face, a thumpin' bass, for a lovin' race!" – themed club classics that combined British, Caribbean, American, and African influences helping cement club culture and laying the visual and musical template for the 1988 Second Summer of Love in the UK and Ibiza. A plaque now commemorates the collective's significant influence on the venue,

Love Muscle
Launched in September 1992, Love Muscle instantly became one of the major gay club nights in London, running every Saturday night for almost a decade. Famous for its uplifting music policy, raunchy stage shows and unique party atmosphere, the night soon attained international renown, regularly attracting clubbers from across the country and beyond every weekend.

Love Muscle's original DJs were Marc Andrews, Mark Monroe and Gareth, who defined the night's music policy of uplifting commercial house, and created a sound that was entirely unique to Love Muscle.  They remained at the helm as weekly residents at the club for nearly 7 years, and were then joined and ultimately replaced by Mark O, Dorian, Rich B, Rich P and Sean Sirrs.

Love Muscle's music policy was infamous for its uplifting, euphoric, predominately vocal, euro-club sound that often managed to be simultaneously camp and cheesy yet fierce and sub-cultural. Covering the styles of Handbag (Diva/piano/organ/Italo) house, 'Hardbag', Eurodance, dance-pop, progressive house and vocal Trance. Remixes and productions by the likes of Motiv8(Steve Rodway), Almighty, Hi-lux, Alex party, Dancing Divas, Matt Darey, JX, Amen UK, SASH, Xenomania, Paul Masterson and the Trouser Enthusiasts defined the club's sound. DJ Marc Andrews was famous for his pro-longed builds and playful layered mixing style - often teasing tracks that would be played later in the set.

During the early years and again towards the end, the club played host to drag queen Yvette (Ian Hunter-Meek b 1950), a former buyer for Harrods, who gave stage shows containing strippers and live music. During the period when Yvette (also known as Yvette the Conqueror) first hosted Love Muscle, Yvette, along with Laurence Malice (founder of Trade nightclub) were regarded as two of the most influential club hosts in London. After Yvette left the Fridge, Paul Bakalite hosted Love Muscle for a while (1995/96) and is remembered for his affable persona, meeting and greeting patrons in the Fridge foyer and handing out lollipops and novelties to sweaty revellers.

Due to falling numbers and the occasional drugs raid, the night was temporarily closed in 1998, but was soon brought back due to public demand. It never fully recovered however, and became increasingly infrequent during the period 2000–2002. The night was finally closed (ostensibly for good) in 2004.

Love Muscle returned to the Fridge on 31 December 2008 with the original promoter Andrew Czezowski and the exhilarating pyrotechnics and production effects the night was renowned for.

The night's name, Love Muscle, is a euphemism for the penis, reflecting its raunchy gay appeal.

Escape From Samsara
During the mid '90s, Friday nights were turned over to outside promoters playing trance music, with a different one taking each of the four Fridays of the month:-

1st Friday - Otherworld
2nd Friday - Return to the Source
3rd Friday - Escape from Samsara
last Friday - Science Fiction

(If a month had five Fridays the "spare" one was allocated to a promoter, sometimes Pendragon who played a similar range of music to Escape from Samsara. Pendragon's parties at the Fridge were usually one-off events since their regular venue was the Theatre Factory warehouse at Tyssen Street in Dalston.)

Of the four usual Friday promotions the two most popular and successful nights were Return To The Source and Escape From Samsara, playing mainly hard trance including very fast Goa trance.  It is reckoned that these nights were among the first in the UK to feature what then became the trance music phenomenon.

Escape from Samsara - the name being a reference to the Hindu concept of Saṃsāra - held its first event at The Fridge on 15 September 1995. Formed from the club Megatripolis, they also held occasional events at the Brixton Academy & Bagleys in London; Spain, Morocco, Germany, Czech Republic, Egypt, Israel and Australia. The resident DJs at their events were Beamish and Oberon and there was usually a live performance by an electronic music artist or group, the most frequent appearances being by Cybernaut, Lab 4, The Secret and Audio Pancake. The upstairs balcony area was home to a market which sold fluoro clothing accessories, chai tea, etc. Also noteworthy is the admission and pricing policy where clubbers paid only £3 for entry (compared to the standard price of £10 or more) if they brought a "drum or didge", thus encouraging punters to contribute musically and supporting those who could not afford the full price.  Escape From Samsara then went on to run every Friday night for a number of years at The Fridge with DJs such at Rubec, Tim Samsara, Darren Shambhala, Chris Liberator, Mark EG, Blu Peter and Mark Sinclair all playing behind the decks.  Escape From Samsara became a world-renowned brand that was known for its extraordinary friendly ambience, non profit ethos, whacky performers, free bananas at the end of the night, stunning decorations, giant balloons, confetti drops and pyrotechnic shows. For many it was an introduction into an alternative lifestyle.

Return To The Source
Like Escape from Samsara, Return to the Source also held occasional events at other venues such as the Brixton Academy and Bagleys. They booked a range of psy-trance DJ's (or "deck wizards" as they were listed on the flyers) with the resident DJ being Mark Allen. The resident at Science Fiction was Sid Shanti and at Otherworld they were Lol and Yazz.

Return to the Source and Science Fiction both relocated to different London venues in May 1997, moving to Bagleys in Kings Cross and Cloud 9 in Vauxhall respectively. Thereafter, Escape from Samsara was held every Friday at The Fridge.

The Fridge Bar
The Fridge Bar, located next-door to The Fridge, was typically used to host an afterparty on Saturday mornings, with DJs playing music to the small basement dancefloor. A hand-stamp allowed paying punters to come and go freely, some choosing to spend part of the morning in the Peace Gardens park situated immediately opposite the venue.

Album releases
An embodiment of The Fridge's most revered night Soul II Soul named "At the Africa Centre" for its original venue was released as a compilation album in 2003, mixed by Jazzie B

Escape from Samsara released a total of three unmixed compilation albums between 1996 and 1999. The group Zen Terrorists and solo artist SBL (Silicon Based Life) also both later released Live at Escape from Samsara albums. The second CD of the debut album by Lab 4 consisted of a live set recorded at Escape from Samsara at the Fridge, too.

Return to the Source released a number of compilation albums and a few singles on their label of the same name. Otherworld released a trance compilation entitled Dance, Trance & Magic Plants on the Transient label in 1997.

Closure
The Fridge finally closed on 17 March 2010. The Love Muscle xx website was online until 2014 and played loops of the club's memorable tracks, starting with Bob Sinclar's Save Our Souls.

The venue reopened in 2011 as Electric Brixton.

See also

List of electronic dance music venues
Superclub

References

External links
 The Fridge website

Nightclubs in London
LGBT nightclubs in London
Buildings and structures in the London Borough of Lambeth
Electronic dance music venues
Tourist attractions in the London Borough of Lambeth
History of the London Borough of Lambeth
Brixton
Defunct LGBT nightclubs